Knightfall is the first full-length album by multinational Swedish band, Silent Images. The album is based on the Batman:Knightfall story arc, with additional cues taken from the Batman: Arkham game series, as well as trinkets of philosophy. The album has been heralded as a didactic dissection of the intimate dichotomy between the Dark Knight and Bane as well as an analysis of sociopolitical issues through the narrative medium. Lyrically, Shakespearean English, German, French and Latin are utilized to complement the diverse musicality. The band´s hybridization of various subgenres has led to their music being branded as "Contemporary Extreme Metal".

Track listing

Personnel
David Sosa Larzabal – guitars
Manolo Beltran – drums
Renzo Jaldin – bass
Mithun MK - vocals

References

External links
Silent Images
Music Video for Ignotum
Metal Hammer Spain: Interview with Silent Images
Review
Review

2016 albums
Silent Images albums
Concept albums
Batman music